Popowice  is a village in the administrative district of Gmina Jordanów Śląski, within Wrocław County, Lower Silesian Voivodeship, in south-western Poland. Prior to 1945 it was in Germany. Erich Fellgiebel was born in the village.

References

Popowice